The 27th Emmy Awards, later known as the 27th Primetime Emmy Awards, were handed out on May 19, 1975.  There was no host this year. Winners are listed in bold and series' networks are in parentheses.

The top shows of the night were Mary Tyler Moore, and Upstairs, Downstairs which won its second straight Emmy for Outstanding Drama Series. M*A*S*H led all shows with nine major nominations heading into the ceremony, but only won one award. Mary Tyler Moore led all shows with four major wins. Upstairs, Downstairs became the first non American drama to win the outstanding drama award twice and was a third win in five years for a British produced drama. 

This is the 1st ceremony where one network received all the nominations in a Series category. It would not happen again until the 
39th Primetime Emmy Awards.

Winners and nominees

Note: Winners are indicated in bold type.

Programs

Acting

Lead performances

Supporting performances

Directing

Writing

Most major nominations
By network 
 CBS – 55
 ABC – 33
 NBC – 24

 By program
 M*A*S*H (CBS) – 9
 Mary Tyler Moore (CBS) – 8
 QB VII (ABC) – 7
 Queen of the Stardust Ballroom (CBS) / Upstairs, Downstairs (PBS) – 6
 Kojak (CBS) / Love Among the Ruins (ABC) / The Missiles of October (ABC) / Rhoda (CBS) – 5

Most major awards
By network 
 CBS – 16
 ABC – 10
 NBC – 5
 PBS – 3

 By program
 Mary Tyler Moore (CBS) – 4
 Love Among the Ruins (ABC) – 4
 The Carol Burnett Show (CBS) / Upstairs, Downstairs (PBS) – 3

Notes

References

External links
 Emmys.com list of 1975 Nominees & Winners
 

027
Primetime Emmy Awards
Primetime Emmy
May 1975 events in the United States